Lefred Thouron is a cartoonist and writer born in Nancy, France in 1961.

Biography
His first cartoons were published in 1984 in Hara-Kiri. Following, his work will be published in the weekly news magazine L'événement du Jeudi, the daily Libération, 7 à Paris, La Grosse Bertha and Charlie Hebdo (which he left in 1996 following the «Patrick Font » controversy). Having authored 20 or so books, Lefred currently works for the icon of French irreverent political press, Le Canard Enchaîné, where he is one of the chief contributors with Pétillon and Cabu; l'Équipe magazine where he publishes a weekly page that covers sports news; Fluide Glacial where he contributes humorous illustrations, cartoons, articles and photo-stories.

As a writer, Lefred Thouron has collaborated with Yan Lindingre on « Les carottes sont crues », a spoof on the "organic" craze, has brought back to life "The Adventures of Super-Dupont" with Gotlib and Solé in the magazine Fluide Glacial, and above all, has worked with Diego Aranega to produce « Casiers Judiciaires », slices of life in a provincial courthouse, recently published as a collection by Dargaud.

Bibliography

Press
Le Canard Enchaîné, L’Équipe Magazine, Fluide Glacial, La Décroissance, CQFD, Libération, etc.

Books and collections

Dargaud

Casiers Judiciaires (artwork by Diego Aranega)

Glénat

Œuvres complètes, tome 8 (houit)
Manger est bon
Nos animaux les bêtes
Étons modernes

Fluide Glacial

Soyons sports dans l’effort
Le sport bourse pleine
Je suis gland
Ich bin vraiiiment gland
Superdupont

Hors Collection

Ana-Gangné

Canal+ éditions

600 blagues de Sport (with Eric Bayle)

Bikini

Les 5000 meilleurs dessins de Lefred Thouron
Gros Congé
Toi & Moi
Poulet pur porc

Les Requins Marteaux

Les carottes sont crues (artwork by Lindingre)

Verticales

Aimémé Jacquet, droit au but par la diagonale

Albin Michel

Bernadette, priez pour nous

Editions du Layeur

Et puis c’est comme ça

French cartoonists
Living people
Year of birth missing (living people)